Garzon is a town and municipality in the Huila Department, Colombia.

Garzon is a municipality located in the center of the Colombian department of Huila, about 450 kilometers south of Bogotá and 114 miles south of the provincial capital, Neiva. Known as the Diocesan Capital of Huila, it is the first Catholic diocese in the region. Proud of its religious architecture and culture, Garzón is also called "the Soul of Huila." It is known for being one of the cities in the world and inside Huila where the best coffee in the world is grown and processed. This has led to the actor Hugh Jackman and his partner David Steingard to buying the coffee in Garzón for his company, foundation and coffee shop in New York called Laughing Man Foundation.

History
The town's first beginnings were c. 1775 on lands donated by Don Vicente Manrique de Lara. In 1783, the hamlet known as "Garzoncito" was officially founded. On January 1, 1788, it was granted the status of municipality and in 1810 received the title of Villa. On May 19, 1825, the town was decreed head of the Canton of Timaná; it later became the capital of the southern province of Colima.

The place where town is located has been known since remote times with the name of "Garzoncito" but once the municipality was erected the diminutive was suppressed, remaining as it is known today. Historians explain that its name is also due to the fact that at the time when the Spanish took possession of these lands, an animal, a huge heron species called Garzón appeared, according to the ancients. This animal was extremely aggressive, it was seen for some time and then it disappeared; the settlers called it the great heron and the river where this animal appeared was suppressed the name of Tocheré by that of Garzón.

The painter and poet Yesid Morales Ramírez is a native of Garzón. The sculptor Emiro Garzón resides in La Jagua, a small village that belongs to Garzón. Colombian citizen Pablo Emilio Figueroa Urriago was the founder of the bambuco music and folkloric festivals in the town and owner of the traditional Café Minino and other cultural and entertainment centers with an auditorium, bar and billiards. At present the Café Minino is called Café Roxy, but it is still in the same facilities, in the Plaza de Bolívar and it is still called by its assistants like El Minino, by the nickname that its owner received for his great humor. The teacher and novelist Antonio Iriarte Cadena and the writers Amadeo González Treviño (Author of Footprints of war, book of chronicles and a diatribe against the local sufferings by the El Quimbo dam), founder of the literary magazine and cultural organization Cuatro Tablas and Diego Calle Cadavid and Hamilton Benedicto Lizcano Parra reside in this municipality. Writer and journalist Juan Pablo Plata spent his childhood and adolescence here. Women's achievements in this town are also highlighted. Irma Vargas Cadena was the first female doctor in this city and her sister Ángela Constanza Vargas Cadena (Angie McCallum), was, in turn, the first female Petroleum Engineer. The controversial politician who opposed the peace talks with the FARC and the post-conflict, Senator Ernesto Macías Tovar, of the Democratic Center, was born in this town and occasionally visits the city. Jaime Bravo Motta and Edgar Bonilla Ramírez have run the power as mayors while they have been involved in investigations for their administrative actions of the public treasury and the money intended for health care and the recreational center Manila.

The Baracoa Cultural Foundation, known in the country's music scene for its contribution to Colombian Andean music, comes from this municipality and one of its most popular groups is Las Gargueñas, which plays the rural music of this region. Neivana singer Carolina Ramos lived in this municipality for eight years that served as inspiration for his work A sentiment made song.

Catholic priests have been influential and controversial in a city placed in a secular country, such as Libardo Ramírez, the current parish priest of the San José de Nazareth Church, and the priest Carlos Arturo Rojas. The writer David Alberto Campos lived for a while in this cozy municipality, which has been sung by world-renowned musical composers Jorge Villamil Cordovez and Ramiro Chavarro.

Economy
The municipality is mainly agricultural, based on the cultivation of coffee, cacao, fruit, and livestock. Fish farming is an important part of its economy. Garzón market products are sold in Neiva and Bogota.

Weather
The town of Garzón is known for its mild climate, with a winter season (rainy season) in the months of March, April and May, and summer season in other months of the year (November, December and January) when temperatures as high as 30 °C. are reached.

Garzón is watered by the Magdalena and Suaza rivers and other minor rivers, including Agua Caliente, Caguancito, Cara de Perro, Damas, Garzoncito, Pescado and Río Loro.

References

Municipalities of Huila Department